This is a list of largest galaxies known, sorted by order of increasing major axis diameters. The unit of measurement used is the light-year (approximately 9.46 kilometers).

Overview 

Galaxies are vast collections of stars, planets, nebulae and other objects that are surrounded by an interstellar medium and held together by gravity. They do not have a definite boundary by nature, and are characterized with gradually decreasing stellar density as a function of increasing distance from its center. Because of this, measuring the sizes of galaxies can often be difficult and have a wide range of results depending on the sensitivity of the detection equipment and the methodology being used. Some galaxies emit more strongly in wavelengths outside the visible spectrum, depending on its stellar population, whose stars may emit more strongly in other wavelengths that are beyond the detection range. It is also important to consider the morphology of the galaxy when attempting to measure its size - an issue that has been raised by the Russian astrophysicist B.A. Vorontsov-Vel'Yaminov in 1961, which considers separate determination methods in measuring the sizes of spiral and elliptical galaxies.

For a full context about how the diameters of galaxies are measured, including the estimation methods stated in this list, see section Galaxy#Physical diameters.

List

Listed below are galaxies with diameters greater than 500,000 light-years. This list uses the mean cosmological parameters of the Lambda-CDM model based on results from the 2015 Planck collaboration, where H0 = 67.74 km/s/Mpc, ΩΛ = 0.6911, and Ωm = 0.3089. Due to different techniques, each figure listed on the galaxies has varying degrees of confidence in them. The reference to those sizes plus further additional details can be accessed by clicking the link for NED on the right-hand side of the table.

Listed below are some notable galaxies under 500,000 light-years in diameter, for the purpose of comparison. All links to NED are available, except for the Milky Way, which is linked to the relevant paper detailing its size.

See also
List of largest known stars
List of most massive stars
List of most massive black holes
List of largest cosmic structures
List of largest nebulae

Notes

References

Further reading

Galaxies
Lists of astronomical objects
Lists of superlatives in astronomy
Lists of extreme points
Lists of galaxies